Kalamazoo College is a private liberal arts college in Kalamazoo, Michigan. Founded in 1833 by Baptist ministers as the Michigan and Huron Institute, Kalamazoo is the oldest private college in the U.S. state of Michigan. From 1840 to 1850, the institute operated as the Kalamazoo Branch of the University of Michigan. After receiving its charter from the state in 1855, the institute changed its name to Kalamazoo College.

Kalamazoo is a member of the Consortium of Liberal Arts Colleges (CLAC) and the Great Lakes Colleges Association. The college's sports teams are nicknamed the Hornets and compete in the NCAA Division III Michigan Intercollegiate Athletic Association.

History

Kalamazoo College was founded in 1833 by a group of Baptist ministers as the Michigan and Huron Institute. Its charter was granted on April 22, 1833, the first school chartered by the Legislative Council of the Territory of Michigan.  Instruction at the Institute began in fall 1836.  In 1837, the name of the fledgling college was changed to the Kalamazoo Literary Institute and school officials made their first attempt to secure recognition as a college from the state of Michigan. In 1838, however, the University of Michigan opened the Kalamazoo Branch of the University of Michigan, providing a local competitor to the Literary Institute.  In 1840, the two schools merged, and from 1840 to 1850, the college operated as the Kalamazoo Branch of the University of Michigan. In 1850, the Kalamazoo Literary Institute name was restored and in 1855 the school finally received an educational charter from the State of Michigan; it was now officially a college. The school changed its name to Kalamazoo College.

James Stone, the first president of Kalamazoo College, led the school from 1842 through 1863 and was responsible for instituting the high academic standards that allowed the college to receive its charter. Shortly after becoming president, Stone proposed the addition of a theological seminary to increase the supply of ministers in the region. With the support of the Baptist church, classes at the Kalamazoo Theological Seminary began in 1848 with 11 students. At the same time, the Female Department continued to expand under the watchful eye of Lucinda Hinsdale Stone. In 1845–46, almost half of the 90 students enrolled in Kalamazoo were women.

The first known student of African descent to attend Kalamazoo College was ex-slave Rufus Lewis Perry. Perry attended Kalamazoo Theological Seminary from 1860 to 1861, but left before he received a diploma. He was ordained a Baptist minister in Ann Arbor in 1861, and later earned a Ph.D. from State University in Louisville, Kentucky. Jamaican-born brothers Solomon and John Williamson were the first black graduates from "K," receiving their diplomas in 1911. Kalamazoo College also served as a pioneer in coed education, granting its first degree to a woman, Catherine V. Eldred, in 1870.

In 1877, Kalamazoo College students published the first edition of The Index, a student-run newspaper that continues to publish today. The college also publishes The Cauldron, an annual literary-arts journal, and The Passage, an annual compilation of students' work from study abroad.

Kalamazoo College's reputation was built during the presidency of Weimer Hicks, who served from 1954 to 1971. Hicks conceived of the "K Plan" program under which most Kalamazoo students spend at least one term abroad and spend at least one term working in an academic internship. 

On January 3, 2006, Kalamazoo College opened the new Upjohn Library Commons which includes the completely renovated skeleton of the older library, and an extension which adds to its volume capacity.

A marker designating the college as a Michigan Historic Site was erected in 1983 by the Michigan History Division, Department of State. The inscription reads:

The first classroom building for the Michigan and Huron Institute, now Kalamazoo College, was erected on this site between June and September of 1836. The charter bill for the school had been introduced in the Michigan Territorial Legislative Council on January 18, 1833, and signed into law by Governor George B. Porter on April 22, 1833. Village pledges supplied funds for the two-story frame classroom structure, which was the start of Michigan’s first church-related college.

Academics

Admissions 

Kalamazoo is considered "more selective" by U.S. News & World Report. For the Class of 2024 (enrolled fall 2020), Kalamazoo received 3,456 applications and accepted 2,569 (74.3%). Of those accepted, 384 enrolled, a yield rate (the percentage of accepted students who choose to attend the university) of 14.9%. Kalamazoo's freshman retention rate is 83%, with 79% going on to graduate within six years.

Of the 44% of enrolled freshmen in 2020 who submitted SAT scores; the middle 50 percent Composite scores were 1150-1360. Of the 20% of the incoming freshman class who submitted ACT scores; the middle 50 percent Composite score was between 25 and 30.

Together with Michigan State University, Michigan Technological University, Wayne State University, Hillsdale College, Calvin University, and Hope College, Kalamazoo College is one of the seven college-sponsors of the National Merit Scholarship Program in the state. The college sponsored 2 Merit Scholarship awards in 2020. In the 2020–2021 academic year, 2 first-year students were National Merit Scholars.

Academic distinctions

Kalamazoo offers 30 majors spread across the fields of Fine Arts, Humanities, Modern and Classical Languages and Literature, Natural Sciences and Mathematics, and Social Sciences. Additionally, the college offers 22 minors, 5 special programs, and 13 concentrations. It is listed in Loren Pope's Colleges That Change Lives. Its most popular majors, in terms of 2021 graduates, were:
Biology/Biological Sciences (70)
Business/Commerce (55)
Chemistry (44)
Psychology (36)
Social Sciences (27)
English Language & Literature (24)

A 2017 study by Higher Education Data Sharing lists Kalamazoo College in the top 2 percent of four-year liberal arts colleges in the United States whose graduates go on to earn a Ph.D. According to this study, Kalamazoo College is ranked number seventeen among all private liberal arts colleges and — when compared with all academic institutions — it ranks number thirty-three in Ph.D.s per capita. Among all undergraduate institutions, Kalamazoo College was first per capita in 2005 for recruitment of Peace Corps volunteers.

96 percent of full-time faculty hold a Ph.D. or the terminal degree in their field.

The K Plan
Kalamazoo College emphasizes the importance of experiential education. The academic plan — known as the "K plan" — consists of a rigorous liberal arts education supplemented by experience abroad and in the Kalamazoo community.

Students at Kalamazoo College must fulfill specific degree requirements in order to graduate, as well as completion of three Shared Passages Seminars during the first, sophomore, and senior years at Kalamazoo.  First-year seminars focus on developing writing and communication skills, sophomore seminars emphasize international culture and experience in preparation for study abroad, and senior seminars focus on major specific or interdisciplinary topics to cap a student's education experience.  Upon graduation, students must demonstrate a proficiency in a second language at an intermediate level, satisfy a quantitative reasoning requirement, and complete a senior individualized project which may take the form of a thesis, an artistic performance, or any other work-intensive project of a student's choosing.  These experiences are supplemented by one or more terms abroad, service-learning projects during school terms, and internship opportunities during the summer.

Service-learning
Kalamazoo College initiated the service-learning program in 1997. In 2001, Trustee Ronda Stryker dedicated  to her grandmother the Mary Jane Underwood Stryker Institute for Service learning. This Institute was created to house several service-Learning programs in the school. The current director of the Mary Jane Underwood Stryker Institute is Alison Geist. In 2008, Kalamazoo College had twenty-three on-going service-learning programs. Several courses in the college incorporate service-learning into their curricula. Programs in service-learning include Community Advocates for Parents and Students, Helping Youth through Personal Empowerment, Academic Mentorship In Giants On-going Success, the Woodward School, Keeping the Doors Open, and Farms to K.

Study abroad
About 70% of Kalamazoo College students spend at least one term abroad and the college maintains partnerships with over 45 programs and 22 countries on six continents. Students at Kalamazoo College typically study abroad during their third (junior) Year, and each academic department designs its requirements in a way that assumes majors will study abroad for all or part of junior year though some students may choose to do a short-term study abroad during their second (sophomore) or fourth (senior) year.

Center for Career and Professional Development
In 2009, the Center Career Development merged with the Guilds of Kalamazoo College to create the Center for Career and Professional Development.  The CCPD's mission is to create meaningful connections to the world of work, empowering Kalamazoo College students to explore, identify and pursue their diverse interests, values and passions, and to develop a framework of skills, networks and knowledge for successful lifelong career planning and professional development.  Unique opportunities through the CCPD include the Discovery Externship Program and the Field Experience Program

Athletics

The college's sports teams are known as the Hornets. They compete in the NCAA's Division III and the Michigan Intercollegiate Athletic Association (MIAA). As of 2016, the Hornet Men's tennis squad has won its conference's championship 78 consecutive years. The Kalamazoo Hornets compete in the following sports:

Fall sports:
 American football (M)
 Cross Country (M & W)
 Golf (M & W)
 Soccer (M & W)
 Volleyball (W)

Winter sports:
 Basketball (M & W)
 Swimming/Diving (M & W)

Spring sports :
 Baseball (M)
 Golf  (M & W)
 Softball (W)
 Tennis (M & W)
 Lacrosse (M & W)

Football

College football has been played at Kalamazoo since 1892, when the school completed a record of 0 wins and 2 losses, both to the Olivet Comets.  The school's first win came two years later in 1894 with a 16–4 victory over the Kalamazoo YMCA.  It was 1895 before the school defeated another college football team, with a 12–8 victory over the Alma Scots.

In 1897, the first coach came to the program with Charles Hall, who led the team to a record of 7 wins and 1 loss, earning the Michigan Intercollegiate Athletic Association championship.  The current coach is Jamie Zorbo.

Men's tennis
The Kalamazoo College men's tennis team has won 78 consecutive Michigan Intercollegiate Athletic Association championships (1936–2013) with a record of 426–3 in the MIAA from 1935 - 2007. Kalamazoo has won seven NCAA Division III national championships and has made 25 consecutive NCAA III tournament appearances.

National Runners-up - NCAA Division II:
 1972 - Men's Tennis

National Championships - NCAA Division III:
 1976 - Men's Tennis
 1978 - Men's Tennis
 1986 - Men's Tennis
 1987 - Men's Tennis
 1991 - Men's Tennis
 1992 - Men's Tennis
 1993 - Men's Tennis

National Runners-up - NCAA Division III:
 1982 - Men's Tennis
 1985 - Men's Tennis
 1997 - Men's Tennis
 1999 - Men's Tennis

Men's swimming and diving
Men's swimming and diving at Kalamazoo has an impressive history. The team is known for producing individual national champions in the pool and on the boards, and also for maintaining a national presence with regular appearances as a top-10 team at the NCAA Division III national championships. Their highest finish was 4th in 2010. The swimming and diving team is the second most successful athletic program at Kalamazoo, after the men's tennis team, and it is also one of the top 10 most successful teams in the MIAA, with 27 championships.

Women's cross country
Allison Iott finished 10th in the 2008 NCAA D-3 Championship, earning USTFCCCA All-American honors in cross country. She was Kalamazoo's first-ever women's cross country MIAA conference meet champion and MIAA Conference MVP.

Men's basketball

Basketball dispute
In 2001, the men's basketball team was at the center of a lengthy dispute regarding the outcome of a January 20 game with league rival the Olivet Comets. With Olivet leading 70–69, Kalamazoo center, Kevin Baird, made a shot at the buzzer that was initially waved off by referees. The referees reviewed videotape of the game and determined that the player had, in fact, released his shot before the buzzer; they then awarded Kalamazoo a 71–70 victory. After the game, Olivet filed a protest with the conference commissioner, claiming that officials had misapplied the way in which videotape may be used. On January 23, the conference upheld the protest and awarded Olivet the victory. Kalamazoo then filed a protest with the NCAA, claiming that Olivet's protest was in violation of NCAA bylaws. On February 1, the NCAA upheld Kalamazoo's counter-protest and again awarded the game to the Hornets. The dispute between Olivet and Kalamazoo received national attention and the shot was shown repeatedly on ESPN.

Women's lacrosse
In the 2013–14 academic year, women's lacrosse became a varsity sport at Kalamazoo. It is the college's first new varsity athletic program since 1991. Women's lacrosse previously existed as one of Kalamazoo's student-run club sports. In Spring 2012, the school announced the new program, as well as the hiring of Emilia Ward for the position of head coach. Ward previously coached at Winthrop University, and Adrian College, after lettering four years in women's lacrosse at Manhattan College.

Fight song
The words to the college fight-song, "All Hail to Kazoo," were written by A. G. Walton (1911) with music by D. R. Belcher (1909), arranged by Burton Edward Fischer.

Student life and traditions

Student organizations are one of the main sources of entertainment for the student body. They routinely bring in speakers as well as stage performances, dances, and movie showings.

During the fall quarter, there are two main events: K Fest and the Homecoming dance. At K Fest, student organizations provide activities for the students, such as pumpkin carving and bobbing for apples.

During the winter quarter, the college holds the annual Monte Carlo night, on which the student body raises money by gambling in a makeshift casino where the professors are the dealers. They play for scrip redeemable for prizes.

Pride Ball (formerly Crystal Ball)
Kaleidoscope (formerly known as the Gay, Lesbian, Bisexual, Transgender, and Ally Student Organization, GLBTSO) hosted the Crystal Ball each spring. Crystal Ball was a college-sponsored dance in which attendees would dress in drag or unusual costumes. A long-standing tradition at Kalamazoo, this event was created to educate the campus about GLBT issues and celebrate the persons who make up the GLBT community. In Spring of 2016 the Crystal Ball was renamed Pride Ball. The tradition continues in most other aspects; it is still hosted by the same club and attendees are still encouraged to don attire that thoughtfully represents or challenges their gender identity. This popular event features live music, dancing, and contests.

The Quad
The campus is built around a grassy hill known as "The Quad." The Quad is also the site of numerous large-scale events throughout the year, including Homecoming, Spring Fling, Convocation, and Commencement. At the top of the hill sits Stetson Chapel, a favorite location for alumni wedding services. The bell tower holds the only peal of change ringing bells in Michigan. They were all cast in 1983 at Whitechapel.

The Quad is home to another popular Kalamazoo College student tradition, "streaking the Quad," a noisy, late-night descent in the nude from the chapel, down the hill, and back to the top again. Tradition dictates that students must touch the school sign before returning to the top. There is a mass streak after the spring performance by Frelon, the Kalamazoo College dance group, and also during the day by the senior class. This often coincides with a wedding.

Day of Gracious Living
Since 1974, the college has upheld a springtime tradition of canceling all classes for a "Day of Gracious Living" (DOGL). While it was originally instituted (despite the Student Commission's rejection) as a day for students to relax and have fun, the 1980 Kalamazoo tornado prompted students to spend that year's DOGL helping clean up after the storm and giving back to their community.  Many students enjoy the day at the North Beach in South Haven, Michigan. The date is determined by the president of the Student Commission and kept secret from the student body, though it is usually on a Wednesday during weeks 7–9. On the morning of the Day of Gracious Living, the bells of Stetson Chapel ring, announcing the day to the student body.

Recycling program
Kalamazoo College has become a leading institution in the area of recycling and environmental awareness. A crew of student workers operates one of the nation's most successful recycling programs and organizes the school's participation in the annual RecycleMania event, a competition among over 400 colleges and universities across the United States. In 2005, Kalamazoo College came to national prominence with a 3rd-place finish in the Grand Champion category.  While annually placing in the top five in a variety of categories, in 2008 Kalamazoo College placed first in both the Grand Champion and Stephen K. Gaski Per Capita Classic competitions.

Sustainability
Kalamazoo College signed the President's Climate Commitment in 2007 and has completed a greenhouse gas emission inventory. The college's Hicks Student Center is partially powered by wind and solar energy, and the student group D.I.R.T. (Digging in Renewable Turf) maintains an organic garden on campus. The spring 2009 Energy Sting competition encouraged students to reduce their energy consumption. Kalamazoo received a B on the 2010 College Sustainability Report Card.

Presidents of Kalamazoo College

In January 2016, Jorge Gonzalez was announced as Kalamazoo College's 18th president. He was scheduled to take office on July 1, 2016, and has declared that he will host multiple new interdisciplinary programmes, such as Latin American studies and public health.

In 2005, Eileen Wilson-Oyelaran became Kalamazoo College's 17th president and first female president, as well as the first African-American president of the school. She is the 22nd president overall, including interim and acting presidents. Her immediate predecessors are Bernard Palchick, who served as interim president and returned to the administration; and James F. Jones, who departed to become president of Trinity College in Connecticut.

 Nathaniel Marsh (1835)
 Walter Clark (1835–1836)
 Nathaniel Aldrich Balch (1836–1838)
 David Alden (1838–1840)
 William Dutton (1840–1843), after whom Dutton Street was named; fifth and last principal teacher 
 James Stone (1843–1863)
 John Milton Gregory (1864–1867)
 Kendall Brooks (1868–1887)
 Monson A. Wilcox (1887–1891)
 Theodore Nelson (1891–1892)
 Arthur Gaylord Slocum (1892–1912)
 Herbert Lee Stetson (1912–1922)
 Allan Hoben (1922–1935)
 Charles True Goodsell (1935–1936) (interim)
 Stewart Grant Cole (1936–1938)
 Paul Lamont Thompson (1938–1948)
 Allen B. Stowe (1948–1949) (interim)
 John Scott Everton (1949–1953)
 Harold T. Smith (1953) (interim)
 Weimer K. Hicks (1953–1971)
 George M. Rainsford (1972–1983)
 David W. Breneman (1983–1989)
 Timothy Light (1989–1990) (acting)
 Lawrence D. Bryan (1990–1996)
 James F. Jones (1996–2004)
 Bernard Palchick (2004–2005) (interim)
 Eileen Wilson-Oyelaran (2005-2016)
 Jorge Gonzalez (2016–Present)

Notable people

Alumni

References

External links

 
 Official athletics website

 
Educational institutions established in 1833
Education in Kalamazoo, Michigan
Liberal arts colleges in Michigan
Universities and colleges affiliated with the American Baptist Churches USA
Buildings and structures in Kalamazoo, Michigan
Tourist attractions in Kalamazoo, Michigan
1833 establishments in Michigan Territory
Private universities and colleges in Michigan